Posht-e Rud (also Romanized as Posht-e Rūd) is a village in Mashiz Rural District, in the Central District of Bardsir County, Kerman Province, Iran. At the 2006 census, its population was 19, in 5 families.

References 

Populated places in Bardsir County